Rob Riley (born January 15, 1955) is an American ice hockey coach.

Career 
Riley was the head coach at the United States Military Academy from 1986 to 2004.
 On August 3, 2010, he was named the head coach of the Springfield Falcons, replacing Rob Daum. He is currently an amateur scout for the Columbus Blue Jackets.

Riley's son, Brett, became the first head coach of the men's team at Long Island University in 2020.

Head coaching record

References

External links

1955 births
Living people
American ice hockey coaches
Army Black Knights men's ice hockey coaches
Boston College Eagles men's ice hockey players
Buffalo Sabres scouts
Columbus Blue Jackets scouts
Ice hockey coaches from New York (state)
People from West Point, New York
American men's ice hockey centers